Hao Mingjin (born December 1956) is a Chinese politician who is a vice chairman of the Standing Committee of the National People's Congress and chairman of the China National Democratic Construction Association.

Biography 
Hao was born in Jiaxiang County, Shandong Province in 1956. He had served as Vice President of High people's court of Shandong Province (1996–2007) and Deputy Minister of Supervision (2007–2017). 

In 2008, he was elected as a member of the 11th Chinese People's Political Consultative Conference (CPPCC). On 20 December 2017, he was elected as the chairman of the Central Committee of the China National Democratic Construction Association. On 17 March 2018, he was elected as a Vice Chairman of the Standing Committee of the 13th National People's Congress.

On 7 December 2020, Hao was sanctioned by the United States under Executive Order 13936 for his role in implementing the National Security Law.

References

1956 births
Living people
Chairperson and vice chairpersons of the Standing Committee of the 13th National People's Congress
China University of Political Science and Law alumni
Individuals sanctioned by the United States under the Hong Kong Autonomy Act
Members of the China National Democratic Construction Association
Members of the 10th Chinese People's Political Consultative Conference
Members of the 11th Chinese People's Political Consultative Conference
Members of the Standing Committee of the 12th Chinese People's Political Consultative Conference
Northeast Normal University alumni
People from Jining
Shandong Normal University alumni